The Pointe Ronde is a mountain of the Mont Blanc massif, overlooking Trient in the canton of Valais. It lies near the northern end of the Arête de la Lys, the ridge descending in a north-westerly direction from the Génépi towards the Col de la Forclaz.

References

External links
 Pointe Ronde on Hikr

Mountains of the Alps
Mountains of Valais
Mountains of Switzerland
Two-thousanders of Switzerland
Mont Blanc massif